"Oooh." is the first single from De La Soul's fifth album, Art Official Intelligence: Mosaic Thump, released in 2000.

Track listing
CD 1
"Oooh" (original version) – 3:33
Guest appearance: Redman
"So Good" – 4:26
Guest appearance: Camp Lo
"Oooh" (instrumental) – 3:33

CD 2
"Oooh." (original version) – 3:33
Guest appearance: Redman
"Oooh." (instrumental) – 3:33
"Words & Verbs" featuring Kovas – 3:51

Charts

References

2000 singles
De La Soul songs
Music videos directed by Jeff Richter
2000 songs
Tommy Boy Records singles
Songs written by David Jude Jolicoeur
Songs written by Vincent Mason
Songs written by Kelvin Mercer